Francisco Illingworth Icaza (18 February 1905 – 20 June 1982) served as Vice President of Ecuador in the administration of Camilo Ponce Enríquez from 1956 to 1960. He was President of the Senate from 1956 to 1959. He was member of Partido Conservador (Conservative  Party).

References

1905 births
1982 deaths
Vice presidents of Ecuador
Presidents of the Senate of Ecuador
Social Christian Party (Ecuador) politicians